Llanelli is a constituency of the Senedd. It elects one Member of the Senedd by the first past the post method of election. Also, however, it is one of eight constituencies in the Mid and West Wales electoral region, which elects four additional members, in addition to eight constituency members, to produce a degree of proportional representation for the region as a whole.

Boundaries

1999 to 2007 
The constituency was created for the first election to the Assembly, in 1999, with the name and boundaries of the Llanelli Westminster constituency. It is a Dyfed constituency, one of five constituencies covering, and entirely within, the preserved county of Dyfed.

The other four Dyfed constituencies are Carmarthen East and Dinefwr, Carmarthen West and South Pembrokeshire, Ceredigion and Preseli Pembrokeshire. They are all within the Mid and West Wales electoral region.

The region consists of the eight constituencies of Brecon and Radnorshire, Carmarthen East and Dinefwr, Carmarthen West and South Pembrokeshire, Ceredigion, Llanelli, Meirionnydd Nant Conwy, Montgomeryshire and Preseli Pembrokeshire.

From 2007 
The constituency includes the whole of 9 Carmarthenshire communities (Kidwelly; Llanedi; Llanelli; Llanelli Rural; Llangennech; Llannon; Pembrey and Burry Port Town; Pontyberem; and Trimsaran).

Boundaries changed for the 2007 Assembly election. Llanelli remained one of five Dyfed constituencies and one of eight constituencies in the Mid and West Wales region. However, boundaries within Dyfed changed, to realign them with local government ward boundaries and to reduce disparities in the sizes of constituency electorates, and the boundaries of the region changed, to align them with the boundaries of preserved counties.

The other four Dyfed constituencies were, again, Carmarthen East and Dinefwr, Carmarthen West and South Pembrokeshire, Ceredigion and Preseli Pembrokeshire, all within the Mid and West Wales electoral region.

The region consisted of the constituencies of Brecon and Radnorshire, Carmarthen East and Dinefwr, Carmarthen West and South Pembrokeshire, Ceredigion, Dwyfor Meirionnydd, Llanelli, Montgomeryshire and Preseli Pembrokeshire.

For Westminster purposes, the same new constituency boundaries became effective for the 2010 United Kingdom general election.

Voting 
In general elections for the Senedd, each voter has two votes. The first vote may be used to vote for a candidate to become the Member of the Senedd for the voter's constituency, elected by the first past the post system. The second vote may be used to vote for a regional closed party list of candidates. Additional member seats are allocated from the lists by the d'Hondt method, with constituency results being taken into account in the allocation.

It is a marginal seat between Plaid and the Labour Party, and until the 2016 Assembly election, had never been held by the same party for more than one consecutive term.

Members of the Senedd

Results

Elections in the 2020s

Elections in the 2010s 

Regional ballots rejected: 136

Elections in the 2000s 

2003 Electorate: 33,742
Regional ballots rejected: 166

Elections in the 1990s

References 

Senedd constituencies in the Mid and West Wales electoral region
Llanelli
1999 establishments in Wales
Constituencies established in 1999
Politics of Carmarthenshire